Phosphatidylinositol 4,5-bisphosphate 5-phosphatase A is an enzyme that in humans is encoded by the INPP5J gene.

References

Further reading